Pipher v. Parsell is a case that was decided before the Supreme Court of Delaware. It shows that a minor can be held to an adult standard of care when engaging in inherently dangerous activities such as driving.

Facts 
Three 16-year-olds were driving in a truck, all seated in the front seat: One boy (Parsell) driving and two girls, one in the middle seat and one next to the passenger side door. A passenger, the girl next to the door (Beisel), grabbed the steering wheel as if intending to make a car crash, at which all the occupants of laughed. A few minutes later the same girl grabbed the steering wheel again, this time actually causing an accident. The girl in the middle (Pipher), suffered damages and sued the driver.

"As they were traveling at 55 mph, Beisel unexpectedly "grabbed the steering wheel causing the truck to veer off onto the shoulder of the road." Parsell testified that Beisel's conduct caused him both shock and surprise. Although Beisel's conduct prompted him to be on his guard, Parsell further testified that he did not expect Beisel to grab the wheel again. Nevertheless, his recognition of how serious Beisel's conduct was, shows he was aware that he now had someone in his car who had engaged in dangerous behavior."

Parsell testified that he did nothing in response to Beisel's initial action. Approximately thirty seconds later, Beisel again yanked the steering wheel, causing Parsell's truck to leave the roadway, slide down an embankment and strike a tree. Pipher was injured as a result of the collision."

Holding 
In an opinion written by Justice Holland, the court held that the plaintiff's evidence should have been submitted to the jury because it was possible that the accident was foreseeable.

"In general, where the actions of a passenger that cause an accident are not foreseeable, there is no negligence attributable to the driver. But, when actions of a passenger that interfere with the driver's safe operation of the motor vehicle are foreseeable, the failure to prevent such conduct may be a breach of the driver's duty to either other passengers or to the public. Under the circumstances of this case, a reasonable jury could find that Parsell breached his duty to protect Pipher from Beisel by preventing Beisel from grabbing the steering wheel a second time."

The case was reversed and remanded.

Notes

References

2007 road incidents
Road incidents in the United States
Traffic collisions
Delaware state case law
2007 in United States case law
Juvenile case law
2007 in Delaware